Mantarlı is a village in the Tercan District, Erzincan Province, Turkey. The village is populated by Kurds of the Lolan tribe and had a population of 34 in 2021.

References 

Villages in Tercan District
Kurdish settlements in Erzincan Province